David Aganzo Méndez (born 10 January 1981) is a Spanish former footballer who played as a striker.

He amassed La Liga totals of 94 matches and 19 goals over six seasons, appearing in the competition for Real Madrid, Espanyol, Valladolid and Racing Santander. He added 181 games and 58 goals in Segunda División, and also played professionally in Israel and Greece.

Club career
Born in Madrid, Aganzo was a product of Real Madrid's youth system, and made his debut with the first team on 20 February 2000 in a 1–1 away draw against Valencia CF. Never a part of the club's plans, he went on to serve four consecutive loans: CF Extremadura, RCD Espanyol, Real Valladolid and Levante UD; however, after appearing against Rosenborg BK in the 1999–2000 UEFA Champions League, he earned a winner's medal.

In the 2004–05 season, Aganzo signed with Racing de Santander in La Liga, where he was rarely used except in his first year. In January 2006, he had a small loan stint at Beitar Jerusalem FC.

After moving to Deportivo Alavés for the 2007–08 campaign, contributing 11 goals to help the Basques narrowly avoid second division relegation, Aganzo was released at the end of the season, joining another side in that tier, recently promoted Rayo Vallecano, on a free transfer. He scored a career-best 12 goals in his first year as the team easily retained their newfound league status, being regularly used over three years and leaving the club in July 2011, aged 30.

In early September 2012, Aganzo signed with Aris Thessaloniki F.C. of the Super League Greece from Hércules CF, penning a one-year contract. He returned to his country two years later, joining division two club CD Lugo.

Aganzo retired at the age of 34. In November 2017, he replaced Luis Rubiales at the helm of the Association of Spanish Footballers.

International career
Aganzo represented Spain at the 1999 FIFA World Youth Championship, playing three games as the nation emerged victorious in Nigeria.

Personal life
Aganzo's wife, Brazilian footballer Milene Domingues, played in Spain from 2002 to 2009 (including two years in the ladies' team of Rayo Vallecano). She was previously married to Ronaldo.

Honours

Club
Real Madrid
UEFA Champions League: 1999–2000

International
Spain U20
FIFA World Youth Championship: 1999

References

External links

1981 births
Living people
Spanish footballers
Footballers from Madrid
Association football forwards
La Liga players
Segunda División players
Real Madrid C footballers
Real Madrid CF players
CF Extremadura footballers
RCD Espanyol footballers
Real Valladolid players
Levante UD footballers
Racing de Santander players
Deportivo Alavés players
Rayo Vallecano players
Hércules CF players
CD Lugo players
Israeli Premier League players
Beitar Jerusalem F.C. players
Super League Greece players
Aris Thessaloniki F.C. players
UEFA Champions League winning players
Spain youth international footballers
Spain under-21 international footballers
Spanish expatriate footballers
Expatriate footballers in Israel
Expatriate footballers in Greece
Spanish expatriate sportspeople in Greece
Spanish expatriate sportspeople in Israel
Spanish trade union leaders